Minuscule 469 (in the Gregory-Aland numbering), α 306 (in the Soden numbering), is a Greek minuscule manuscript of the New Testament, on parchment. Palaeographically it has been assigned to the 13th century.
It was adapted for liturgical use. Formerly it was labeled by 119a, 139p, and 56r.

Description 

The codex contains the text of the whole New Testament except Gospels on 229 parchment leaves (size ), with only one lacuna (2 Corinthians 1:8-2:4). The text is written in one column per page, 24-25 lines per page.

The Catholic epistles follow the Pauline epistles.

Text 

The Greek text of the codex is a representative of the Byzantine text-type. Aland placed it in Category V.

History 
The manuscript was dated by F. H. A. Scrivener to the 10th century, but the Apocalypse to the 13th century, C. R. Gregory dated it to the 13th or 14th century. It was dated by the INTF to the 13th century.

The manuscript was slightly examined by Scholz, Reiche and C. R. Gregory (1885). It was the last manuscript added it to the list of New Testament manuscripts by Scholz. It was examined and described by Paulin Martin. Herman C. Hoskier collated its text only for the Book of Revelation.

It was added to the list of New Testament manuscripts by Scholz. 
Formerly it was labeled by 119a, 139p, and 56r. In 1908 Gregory gave the number 469 to it.

It is currently housed at the Bibliothèque nationale de France (Gr. 102A) in Paris.

See also 

 List of New Testament minuscules
 Biblical manuscript
 Textual criticism

References

Further reading 

 Herman C. Hoskier, Concerning the Text of the Apocalypse (1 vol., London, 1929), pp. 170–178.

External links 
 

Greek New Testament minuscules
13th-century biblical manuscripts
Bibliothèque nationale de France collections